Ronald Haley (born 29 November 1941) is a New Zealand former cricketer. He played one List A cricket match for Otago in 1970/71.

See also
 List of Otago representative cricketers

References

External links
 

1941 births
Living people
New Zealand cricketers
Otago cricketers
Cricketers from Dunedin